The South African Army is divided into functional branches, known as corps.  Most consist of units, but some, such as the SA Staff Corps, consist only of personnel who are assigned to headquarters and units.  The following is a list of corps established since 1912;   those which still exist are shown in bold.

The SA Defence Act Amendment Act, No. 22 of 1922 re-organised the Permanent Force. From 1 February 1923 the Permanent Force consisted of:
the SA Staff Corps, 
SA Instructional Corps, 
SA Naval Service, 
SA Field Artillery, 
1st Regiment, 
SAM.R.,
the SA Permanent Garrison Artillery, 
the South African Engineer Corps, 
the South African Air Force, 
SA Service Corps, 
SA Medical Corps, 
SA Ordnance Corps, 
SA Veterinary Corps and the 
SA Administrative, Pay and Clerical Corps.

Staff

Staff
Permanent Force Staff (1912–23)
SA Staff Corps (formed 1923)
SA Instructional Corps (1923–54)incorporated into SA Infantry Corps

Combat Services

Artillery
Field Artillery Branch (Citizen Force) (1913–34)  incorporated into SAA
SA Field Artillery (1915–19)
SA Heavy Artillery (1915–19)
SA Field Artillery (1923–34) - incorporated into SA Artillery
SA Permanent Garrison Artillery (1921–34)  incorporated into SAA
SA Garrison Artillery (1913–34) - incorporated into SAA
South African Artillery (SAA) (formed 1934)
SA Anti-Aircraft (formed 1984)

Mounted Rifles
SA Mounted Riflemen (1913–26)
Mounted Rifles Branch (Citizen Force) (1913–35) - incorporated into infantry

Dismounted Rifles
Dismounted Rifles Branch (Citizen Force) (1913–29)

Infantry
Infantry Branch (Citizen Force) (1913–43) - incorporated into SA Armoured Corps
SA Infantry Corps (born 1954)

Armour
SA Tank Corps (1940–43)
South African Armoured Corps (formed 1943) - included infantry until 1954

Combat Support

Engineers
SA Engineer Corps (1914–16)
South African Engineer Corps (formed 1923)

Signals
Communication Branch (Citizen Force) (1913–23)
SA Field Post and Telegraph Corps (1914–19)
South African Corps of Signals (formed 1923)

SA Military Pigeon Service (1939-?45)

Supporting Services

Administration and Logistics
SA Service Corps (1913–39) - incorporated into 'Q' Services Corps
SA Ordnance Corps (1923–39) - incorporated into 'Q' Services Corps
SA Corps of Mechanics (1939-39) - incorporated into 'Q' Services Corps
'Q' Services Corps (1939–49) - later Administrative Services Corps
Administrative Services Corps (1949–1975)
Army Postal Service (1940–45)
Personnel Services Corps (formed 1975)
 Ordnance Services Corps (formed 1975)

Technical Services Corps (formed 1939)
SA Caterers Corps (formed 1969)
SA Ammunition Corps (formed 1973)
Corps of Professional Officers (formed 1975)

Medical
SA Medical Corps (1913–70) - incorporated into SA Medical Service
SA Veterinary Corps (1913–46) - incorporated into SAMC
SA Military Nursing Service (1914–70) 
SA Military Nursing Corps (1970–72) - incorporated into SAMS

Financial
SA Administrative, Pay & Clerical Corps (1923–39) - incorporated into QSC
SA Pay Corps (1940–45)
Finance Services Corps (1972–75)
Finance Services Corps (formed 1979)

Military Police
SA Corps of Military Police (formed 1938)

Intelligence
SA Intelligence Corps (1940–45)
SA Army Intelligence Corps (formed 1977)

Chaplains
SA Corps of Chaplains (1946–68) - incorporated into SA Chaplains Service

Science
SA Corps of Scientists (1947–72)

Women's Services
Women's Auxiliary Army Service (1940–47)
Women's Auxiliary Military Police Corps (1942–46)
Women's Defence Corps (1947–71)
Civil Defence Corps (1971–77)
SA Army Women's Corps (1977–98)

Special Services
Special Service Corps (born 1964)

Music
SA Corps of Bandsmen (born 1969)

"Non-European" Services
South African Native Labour Corps (1915–19)
Cape Corps (1940–50)
Indian Service Corps (1940–42)
Native Military Corps (1940–50)
SA Cape Corps (1963-90s)
SA Supporting Services Corps (1974-90s)
SA Indian Corps (1975-90s)

Commandos
Defence Rifle Associations (1913–49)
Rifle Commandos (1949–58)
Commandos ('South African Commando System') (1958–2007)

See Also 
 List of Helmet and Shoulder Flashes and Hackles of South African Military Units
 List of badges of the South African Army

References

Military history of South Africa
South African administrative corps